KR Movies and Entertainment is a film production house from Kolkata, India. Their latest film production project was the Bengali film named Bawal released on 12 June 2015. Their first production was the Bengali film C/O Sir in 2013 directed by Kaushik Ganguly.

Films

References

External links
 KR Moviez

Indian companies established in 2013
Indian film studios
Film distributors of India
Entertainment companies of India
Film production companies based in Kolkata
Mass media companies established in 2013
2013 establishments in West Bengal